The 1961 Omloop Het Volk was the 16th edition of the Omloop Het Volk cycle race and was held on 4 March 1961. The race started and finished in Ghent. The race was won by Arthur Decabooter.

General classification

References

1961
Omloop Het Nieuwsblad
Omloop Het Nieuwsblad